Carolyn (Coyne) Dykema (born December 26, 1967, Charlottesville, Virginia) was the Massachusetts state representative from the Massachusetts House of Representatives' 8th Middlesex district from 2009 until her resignation to take a private sector job in 2022.

For 2012 and subsequent elections, the Eighth Middlesex is made up of Holliston, Hopkinton, Southborough, and precinct 2 of Westborough.  Holliston and Hopkinton are in Middlesex County while Southborough and Westborough are in Worcester County. When Dykema was first elected, the Eighth Middlesex comprised the towns of Holliston and Hopkinton and precincts in Medway (Norfolk County), Southborough and Westborough.

Public service
Dykema was elected to the Holliston Planning Board in 2003. In 2007, she was elected chair.  She stepped down in April 2008 to run for state representative. As a member of the Planning Board, she was also on numerous related local and regional boards, notably the Metropolitan Area Planning Council, the MetroWest Growth Management Committee and the SuAsCo Community Watershed Council.

Governor Deval Patrick appointed Dykema to the Massachusetts Energy Facilities Siting Board in 2007.

In 2006, the American Legion awarded Dykema, one of the "Katrina Ladies", the Citation for Meritorious Service for spearheading hurricane relief through Operation Help & Hope.

The Massachusetts Commission on the Status of Women named her the 2007 Holliston Unsung Heroine of the Year.

Dykema was elected to the Commonwealth of Massachusetts General Court in 2008 and has been re-elected to office in each biennial election since. Her most recent opponent was Republican Patricia Vanaria in 2014.

Political platform
In 2008, Dykema won against Ed Mills (D-Hopkinton) in the Democratic primary and against Dan Haley (R-Holliston) in the general election on a platform of:
 well-planned economic development
 high-quality public education
 environmental protection

On social issues, she supported:
 equal gay marriage
 a woman's right to choose

In 2010, Dykema faced opposition from Jonathan Loya, also from Holliston.  Loya ran as an independent but identified his party affiliation on the general election ballot as the Liberty Party, a small Libertarian group. Dykema won re-election easily with 71% of the vote.  Her 2010 platform emphasized:
 job growth, especially high-value green jobs
 infrastructure, especially water infrastructure
 continuous improvement in state government and state services
 pension reform
 health care cost containment

Voters re-elected Dykema in 2012, choosing her in a landslide over Marty Lamb (R-Holliston), who had run unsuccessfully for Congress in 2010 against Jim McGovern. Dykema took 61% of the vote in a hotly contested election.

Committee assignments
For the previous legislative session, Dykema sat on these legislative committees:
 Committee on Telecommunications, Utilities, and Energy (Vice Chair)
 Committee on Ways and Means
 Committee on Mental Health, Substance Use, and Recovery
 Committee on Personnel and Administration

Notable past assignments include:
 Joint Committee on Transportation (Vice Chair)
 Joint Committee on Children, Families and Persons with Disabilities
 Joint Committee on Health Care Finance
 Joint Committee on Telecommunications, Utilities, and Energy
 Joint Committee on Ways and Means
 House Committee on Ways and Means
 Joint Committee on Veterans and Federal Affairs
 Joint Committee on Environment, Natural Resources, and Agriculture
 Joint Committee on Housing 
 Water Infrastructure Finance Commission
 Joint Committee on Public Health

Awards as a legislator
For her service as a legislator, Dykema has been honored by the following awards:
 Legislator of the Year Award from the Massachusetts Veterans Service Officers Association, February 15, 2011
 2012 Environmental Leadership Award from the Massachusetts Nursery and Landscape Association, Inc., February 2, 2012
 Agriculture Day Award from the Massachusetts Farm Bureau Federation, April 3, 2012
 2012 Legislator of the Year Award from the Massachusetts Water Works Association, October 11, 2012
 The Holliston American Legion Post's "A Friend Indeed" Award, November 10, 2012
 2014 Legislator of the Year Award from the MWRA Advisory Board, March 19, 2015
 Elaine Beals Conservation Award from the Southborough Open Land Foundation, May 27, 2015
 Challenge Coin from the Armed Forces Committee of Worcester County, March 19, 2016
 2016 Legislator of the Year Award from the Massachusetts Bee Keeper Association, November 22, 2016

Personal life
Dykema grew up in Wellesley. She and her husband Bill live in Holliston. Their three children attended and graduated from the Holliston Public Schools.

Education
Dykema graduated from Wellesley High School in 1985. She attended Wellesley College, where she majored in French, graduating in 1989. She graduated with an MBA from the Kelley School of Business at the Indiana University in 1994.

Business career
Dykema worked at Fidelity Investments between 1989 and 1998, with a break for business school at Indiana University. At the time of her departure, she was senior communications manager in Marlborough and Boston.

During 1998 and 1999, Dykema was a marketing consultant for Pamet River Partners in Boston.

Between 2004 and her election to the legislature, Dykema was the marketing and business development manager at Norfolk Ram, an environmental consulting firm in Milford.

See also
 2019–2020 Massachusetts legislature
 2021–2022 Massachusetts legislature

References

External links
 The General Court of the Commonwealth of Massachusetts, Rep. Carolyn C. Dykema
 Carolyn Dykema, State Representative

1967 births
Living people
People from Wellesley, Massachusetts
Wellesley College alumni
Democratic Party members of the Massachusetts House of Representatives
Women state legislators in Massachusetts
People from Holliston, Massachusetts
21st-century American politicians
21st-century American women politicians